The Vilnius Voivodeship was one of the Grand Duchy of Lithuania's voivodeships, which existed from the voivodeship's creation in 1413 to the destruction of the Lithuanian state in 1795. This voivodeship was Lithuania's largest, most politically and economically important.

History

1413-1566 
The Vilnius Voivodeship was created instead of the Vilnius Viceroyalty during the Pact of Horodło in 1413.

The core of the Vilnius Voivodeship was the Vilnius County, which was composed of the Vilnius Bailiwick, which was composed of the manors of Vilnius, Nemenčinė, Švenčionys, Dysna and other places, in addition to almost all of Lithuania on both side of Neris. Also included was the Breslauja Viceroyalty, the lands of the dukes Giedraičiai and the counties of the so-called Lithuanian Rus', which included Maladzyechna, Minsk, Barysaw, Rechytsa, Propoysk‑Chachersk. Moreover, the Principalities of Halshany, Slutsk, Trobos and Izyaslavl were part of the Vilnius Voivodeship. Novogrudok became a separate Voivodeship in 1507.

The Vilnius Voivodeship was the location of many large estates. These were centred on the following places and owned by those families: Goštautai owned Hieraniony, the Radziwiłłs  had Nyasvizh and Dubingiai, Zaberezinskiai had Zaberezinas, while the Astikai had Vyžuonos.

1566-1795 
Simultaneously, Vitebsk' lands, the Upper Dnieper, most of the Lithuanian Rus', the Principalities of Kletsk and Sluck were separated from the Vilnius Voivodeship.

Aftermath

19th century 
After the partitions of the Polish–Lithuanian Commonwealth, the Vilnius Voivodeship was occupied by the Russian Empire. Most of the territory became the Vilna Governorate. In 1843, its northern part was assigned to Kovno Governorate.

20th century 
After World War I, the lands of the former Vilnius Voivodeship were fought over by the Lithuanian Army, Central Lithuania with its Army, the Polish Army, and the Red Army. Following the annexation of Central Lithuania by Poland, during the Interwar, most of the former Voivodeship ended up under the Second Polish Republic while the rest was ruled by Lithuanians. According to the Soviet–Lithuanian Peace Treaty in 1920, most of the former voivodeship should have been part of Lithuania. After World War II, the occupying Soviet Union assigned most of the voivodeship's territory that was previously under Polish rule to the Byelorussian Soviet Socialist Republic.

Geography and administrative division 
Geographically the area was centred on the city of Vilnius, which had always been the capital of the entity and the seat of a voivode. However, the actual territory of the voivodeship varied over time. Together with the Trakai Voivodeship it was known as Lithuania propria. Until the partitions of the Polish–Lithuanian Commonwealth the voivodeship, also known as a palatinate, was composed of five counties (Lithuanian: plural - pavietai, singular - pavietas):

Voivodes 

The Voivode of Vilnius was ranked first in importance among the secular members of the Lithuanian Council of Lords. In the voivode hierarchy of Poland-Lithuania, established by the Union of Lublin in 1569, the Voivode of Vilnius, who was also a senator of the Polish–Lithuanian Sejm, took the fourth place and the Castellan of Vilnius - the sixth place.

See also 
 Administrative divisions of Lithuania

References

Sources 

 

 

 
Former voivodeships of Grand Duchy of Lithuania
Voivodeships of the Polish–Lithuanian Commonwealth
1413 establishments in Europe
15th-century establishments in Lithuania
1795 disestablishments in the Polish–Lithuanian Commonwealth